The Symbolic Stream Generator (or SSG) is a software productivity aid by Unisys for their mainframe computers of the former UNIVAC 1100/2200 series.

SSG is used to generate RUN-Streams (corresponding to IBM's Job Control Language), apply and administer symbolic changes to program sources as a form of version control, and for many other purposes.

An SSG program (i.e., its "job control script") is called a Skeleton, and its programming language Symstream.

The tool created output streams based on interpreting data provided via multiple input sources. It was originally created by Univac for the creation of Operating System (OS) updates. It was later adopted by the general user community for the creation of complex batch and real-time computer processes. The sources could recursively reference additional sources, providing wide flexibility in input parsing. The rules for output creation were also in source files, with similar levels of dynamic input capability. Interpretation of the multiple input sources allowed for dynamic creation of output stream content. Complex recursive processes could be applied to create program source code, job execution sequences, simulated dynamic input from virtual consoles, and in general provide scripting capabilities reminiscent of the Unix GREP and YACC tools.

See also
List of UNIVAC products
Unisys OS2200 Symbolic Stream Generator (SSG) Programming Reference Manual
History of computing hardware

Scripting languages